The discography of Girlschool, a British all-female heavy metal band, spans over 30 years of a career and consists of thirteen studio albums, six EPs and a large number of compilations. The band was formed in 1978 by Kim McAuliffe, Enid Williams, Kelly Johnson and Denise Dufort. Their first release was the single "Take It All Away" for the small British rock/punk label City Records (November 1979). The song did not chart, but came to the ear of Lemmy Kilmister and of Motörhead manager Doug Smith, who made Girlschool the supporting band on the Overkill tour and managed to get them a contract with the wealthy label Bronze Records.

During the explosion of the new wave of British heavy metal phenomenon, Girlschool released for Bronze four studio albums and many singles, which entered the British charts. Their greatest success came with the split EP St. Valentine's Day Massacre, recorded with Motörhead, which reached number five on the UK Single Chart. The band's following album Hit and Run peaked at number five on the UK Album Chart.

The band success in the United Kingdom rapidly declined in the following years, with the consequence of Girlschool signing for the US label PolyGram in 1985. As a five-piece group they released the album Running Wild, only for the American market, without any charting success. Alone among the band's studio albums, Running Wild would not be reissued in any format until its 2014 CD release. The band signed a new contract with the British label GWR in 1986 and released other two studio albums, before going into quiescence.

In 1989, Castle Communications, a company specialized in cheap reissues of old recordings, obtained the rights for Girlschool’s back catalogue from the bankrupt Bronze Records and later from GWR. During the 1990s, Castle licensed the songs to various labels specialized in mid-priced editions, reissuing also the band studio albums on economic double album compilations on CD. When Castle was acquired by Sanctuary Records in 2000, the rights of the songs changed hands again. In 2004, the new label released re-mastered editions full of bonus tracks of Girlschool's first four studio albums. The Sanctuary Records Group, which was absorbed by Universal Music Group in 2007 but was later divested by the latter through a sale in 2012, now owns the rights to Girlschool's old material, while Warner Music Group handles all global distribution and sales. Universal owns the rights to Running Wild, the band's only Mercury album released exclusively in the United States. The American rights to their other albums originally issued by Mercury were transferred to Warner Music's Alternative Distribution Alliance.

The band continued their recording career with four self-produced albums distributed by British indie label Communiqué, which received good reviews but no significant sale results. Their eleventh album Legacy  was instead released by Wacken Records in 2008 and distributed by SPV/Steamhammer, followed by two more albums in 2011 and 2015 for WMG's German label UDR.

Girlschool's songs appear also on many heavy metal compilations published all over the world, often associated with other notable bands of the NWOBHM, such as Motörhead, Tygers of Pan Tang, Saxon, Angel Witch and Tank.

Albums

Studio albums

Live albums

Compilation albums

Split albums

Extended plays

Singles

Other appearances

Video albums

Music videos

References

External links
Official discography
Reference discography database

Discographies of British artists
Heavy metal group discographies